Demane-Debbih Brothers Stadium ,is a football stadium in Aïn M'lila, Algeria. The stadium holds 10,000 people. It served as a home ground for AS Aïn M'lila which plays in Algerian Ligue Professionnelle 1 until it was replaced by Touhami Zoubir Khelifi Stadium in 2019.

References

Football venues in Algeria
Oum El Bouaghi Province
Buildings and structures in Oum El Bouaghi Province
AS Aïn M'lila